John Henry  Young (27 October 1880 – 7 September 1946) was an Australian art collector, art dealer and art gallery director. Young was born in Petersham, Sydney, New South Wales and died in North Sydney, New South Wales.

He is noted for serving as acting director of the Art Gallery of New South Wales 1944–1945 between the incumbencies of Will Ashton and Hal Missingham.

See also

 Sir Carleton Kemp Allen
 Sydney George Ure Smith
 Roland Shakespeare Wakelin
 Percy Alexander Leason
 Roy De Maistre
 Basil Burdett
 Sir William Dobell
 Robert Richmond Campbell

References

Australian art collectors
Australian art dealers
Australian people of English descent
1880 births
1946 deaths
Artists from Sydney